Shizhong District is a former district of Chongqing Municipality, China.

References

Districts of Chongqing
History of Chongqing